Peter Lynch is an Irish meteorologist, mathematician, blogger and book author.  His interests include numerical weather prediction, dynamic meteorology, Hamiltonian mechanics, the history of meteorology, and the popularisation of mathematics.

Life and career
Lynch was born in Dublin, and educated at University College Dublin, where he obtained his BSc (1968) and MSc (1969) in mathematical science.  He enlisted in the Irish meteorological service (now known as Met Éireann) in 1971, and worked there until 2004, rising to the rank of Head of the Research and Training Division and later Deputy Director.  In 1982, he was awarded a PhD by Trinity College Dublin for his thesis Planetary-scale Hydrodynamic Instability in the Atmosphere written under the supervision of Ray Bates.

In 2004, he moved to academia, becoming Met Éireann Professor of Meteorology at the School of Mathematical Sciences. He has supervised several doctoral theses there. He is now an Emeritus Professor at the School of Mathematical Sciences.

Shortly after formally retiring from UCD in 2011, he started writing a weekly mathematical blog called "That's Maths", about half of the columns also appearing in The Irish Times newspaper (on the first and third Thursdays of each month).  Two books of collected columns have resulted, in 2016 and 2020, respectively.

Scientific meteorology
One of Lynch's principal interests is the scientific approach to weather forecasting and its history, for example publishing a 2000 paper called "Weather Forecasting: from woolly art to solid science". Lewis Fry Richardson pioneered mathematical techniques of weather forecasting and dreamed that weather prediction would one day be an exact science.  Modern computers were not available in Richardson's day and further theoretical advances were needed before Richardson's dream could be a realised.  Lynch examined this issue first in a 2008 paper, and later in his book The Emergence of Numerical Weather Prediction: Richardson's Dream.

Awards
In 2014 Lynch received the European Meteorological Society Silver Medal for "his outstanding contribution to meteorological education and outreach activities, his important scientific contribution to Numerical Weather forecasting and his leadership in international collaborations."  In 2017 he received the Maths Week Ireland award for outstanding work in raising public awareness of mathematics.

Publications
Books
 That’s Maths II (subtitled “A Ton of Wonders”) Logic Press, November 2020, 
 That’s Maths (subtitled “The Mathematical Magic in Everyday Life”) Gill Books, October 2016, 
 Rambling Round Ireland: A Commodius Vicus of Recirculation The Liffey Press, 2010, 
  The Emergence of Numerical Weather Prediction: Richardson's Dream, Cambridge University Press, 2006, 

 Papers
 "The origins of computer weather prediction and climate modeling" In: Journal of Computational Physics 227 (7), 3431–3444 (2008)
 "The emergence of numerical weather prediction: Richardson's dream" Cambridge University Press (2006)
 "The Fronts and Atlantic Storm-Track Experiment (FASTEX): scientific objectives and experimental design" (with A Joly, D Jorgensen, MA Shapiro, ...) In: Bulletin of the American Meteorological Society 78 (9), 1917–1940 (1997)
 "The Dolph-Chebyshev window: A simple optimal filter" In: Monthly weather review 125 (4), 655–660 (1997)
 "Initialization of the HIRLAM model using a digital filter" (with Xiang-Yu Huang) In: Monthly Weather Review 120 (6), 1019–1034 (1992)

References

External links
 
 Balanced Flow on the Spinning Globe, Prof Peter Lynch: 2014 EMS Silver Medal Lecture video
 Personal web page

Irish meteorologists
Irish mathematicians
Mathematics popularizers
Alumni of University College Dublin
People from County Dublin
The Irish Times people
Living people
20th-century Irish scientists
21st-century Irish scientists
20th-century Irish mathematicians
21st-century Irish mathematicians
Year of birth missing (living people)